Mahidpur Assembly constituency is one of the 230 assembly constituencies of Madhya Pradesh a central Indian state. Mahidpur is also part of Ujjain Lok Sabha constituency.

Members of Legislative Assembly

 1957: Totala Rameshwar Dayal Mahadeo, Indian National Congress
 1962: Durgadas Bhagwandas, Indian National Congress
 1967: Ramchandra, Jan Sangh
 1972: Narayan Prasad Sharma, Indian National Congress
 1977: Shiv Narayan Choudhry, Janata Party
 1980: Anandilal Chhajalani, Indian National Congress
 1985: Nathulal Sisodiya, Bharatiya Janata Party
 1990: Babulal Jain, Bharatiya Janata Party
 1993: Babulal Jain, Bharatiya Janata Party
 1998: Dr. Kalpana Parulekar, Indian National Congress
 2003: Bhadur Singh Chouhan, Bharatiya Janata Party
 2008: Dr. Kalpana Parulekar, Indian National Congress
 2013: Bhadur Singh Chouhan, Bharatiya Janata Party
 2018: Bhadur Singh Chouhan, Bharatiya Janata Party

See also
 Ujjain
 Mahidpur
 Ujjain (Lok Sabha constituency)

References

Assembly constituencies of Madhya Pradesh
Politics of Ujjain